Julius Jucikas (born 20 October 1989) is a Lithuanian professional basketball player.

Playing career
A 19-year-old Jucikas started his career with Šilutė of the NKL in 2009.

On 6 July 2015, Jucikas signed with Lietuvos rytas Vilnius of the Lithuanian Basketball League. After two seasons, for both Jucikas and the club, much of which Jucikas mostly spent on the bench, his contract for the 2017–2018 season was terminated by mutual agreement with the team.

On 15 July 2017, he signed with BK Ventspils. He helped Ventspils win the Latvian championship.

In August 2022, Jucikas signed with Úrvalsdeild karla club Stjarnan. He left Stjarnan in end of December after averaging 14.5 points and 6.5 rebounds in 11 games.

Personal life 
His younger brother Matas Jucikas is also a professional basketball player.

References

1989 births
Living people
Aomori Wat's players
BC Juventus
BC Rytas players
BK Ventspils players
Centers (basketball)
Lithuanian men's basketball players
Medalists at the 2011 Summer Universiade
Power forwards (basketball)
Stjarnan men's basketball players
Universiade bronze medalists for Lithuania
Universiade medalists in basketball
Úrvalsdeild karla (basketball) players